Henrikh Mkhitaryan is an Armenian professional footballer who represented the Armenia national football team as a midfielder from his debut in 2007 until his international retirement in 2022. A ten-time Armenian Footballer of the Year, Mkhitaryan scored 32 goals in 95 international appearances, making him the country's all-time top scorer; he surpassed Artur Petrosyan's record of 11 goals on 15 October 2013 when he scored in a 2–2 World Cup qualifier draw with Italy. He made his debut for Armenia in a 1–1 draw against Panama on 14 January 2007, and scored his first international goal over two years later in his ninth appearance for his country against Estonia.

On 29 May 2016, Mkhitaryan scored Armenia's first ever international hat-trick when he netted three times in a 7–1 friendly win over Guatemala in the United States. Mkhitaryan also netted twice in a match (also known as a brace) on three occasions. He scored the most times against Bosnia and Herzegovina and Guatemala, with three total goals against each side.

Mkhitaryan scored 8 goals in FIFA World Cup qualifiers, 10 goals in UEFA European Championship qualifiers and 2 goals in the UEFA Nations League. The remainder of his goals, 12, came in friendlies. Despite playing for Armenia for 15 years, Mkhitaryan never played in the FIFA World Cup or the UEFA European Championship.

Goals
Scores and results list Armenia's goal tally first, score column indicates score after each Mkhitaryan goal.

Statistics

See also

 List of top international men's football goal scorers by country
 List of Armenia international footballers

References

Mkhitaryan, Henrikh
Mkhitaryan, Henrikh
Mkhitaryan